Hopin) is a village in Taunggyi District of Shan State of Myanmar. The village is about 5 kilometers south of the town of Lawksawk on the right (south-eastern) bank the Zawgyi River.

Notes

External links
"Hopin Map — Satellite Images of Hopin" Maplandia World Gazetteer

Populated places in Shan State